The 2008 World Junior Curling Championships were held from March 1 to 9 at the Ishallen in Östersund, Sweden.

Men

Teams

Round-robin standings
Final round-robin standings

Round-robin results

Draw 1
Friday, March 2, 12:00

Draw 2
Friday, March 2, 20:00

Draw 3
Saturday, March 3, 14:00

Draw 4
Sunday, March 4, 08:00

Draw 5
Sunday, March 4, 16:00

Draw 6
Monday, March 5, 09:00

Draw 7
Monday, March 5, 19:00

Draw 8
Tuesday, March 6, 14:00

Draw 9
Wednesday, March 7, 09:00

Tiebreaker
Wednesday, March 7, 14:00

Playoffs

1 vs. 2 Game
Thursday, March 8, 14:00

3 vs. 4 Game
Thursday, March 8, 14:00

Semifinal
Thursday, March 8, 19:00

Bronze-medal game
Friday, March 9, 14:00

Gold-medal game
Friday, March 9, 14:30

Women

Teams

Round-robin standings
Final round-robin standings

Round-robin results

Draw 1
Friday, March 2, 8:00

Draw 2
Friday, March 2, 16:00

Draw 3
Saturday, March 3, 9:00

Draw 4
Saturday, March 3, 19:00

Draw 5
Sunday, March 4, 12:00

Draw 6
Sunday, March 4, 20:00

Draw 7
Monday, March 5, 14:00

Draw 8
Tuesday, March 6, 9:00

Draw 9
Tuesday, March 6, 19:00

Tiebreaker
Wednesday, March 7, 14:00

Playoffs

1 vs. 2 Game
Thursday, March 8, 14:00

3 vs. 4 Game
Thursday, March 8, 14:00

Semifinal
Thursday, March 8, 19:00

Bronze-medal game
Friday, March 9, 9:00

Gold-medal game
Friday, March 9, 9:30

Qualifying events

European Junior Curling Challenge
The European Qualification takes place via a challenge tournament this year in Prague, Czech Republic.  8 women's teams and 12 men's teams will compete for 1 spot to the WJCC.

Men's Rankings

Pacific Junior Curling Championships
Played between 16 and 20 Jan-2008 in Jeonju, Korea.  The format saw a double round-robin with the top 3 making the medal round.  First got a bye to the Final and 2nd and 3rd played in a single semi-final.

Men's Rankings

External links

 WJCC2008
 European Junior Curling Challenge 2008
 USA Junior Nationals
 Pacific Curling Championships

World Junior Curling Championships
World Junior Curling Championships, 2008
International curling competitions hosted by Sweden
Sports competitions in Östersund
2008 in Swedish sport
March 2008 sports events in Europe
2008 in youth sport